José López-Maeso Urquiza (born 24 December 1956) is a Spanish former professional tennis player.

Urquiza currently works for Canal+ Spain as a TV commentator for tennis matches. He also has his own tennis club in Puertollano, which is called Real Club de Tenis López-Maeso.

External links 
 
  
 

1956 births
Living people
People from Puertollano
Sportspeople from the Province of Ciudad Real
Spanish male tennis players
Spanish sports broadcasters
Tennis players from Madrid
Tennis commentators